Lars Stefan Lövgren (born 21 December 1970) is a Swedish former handball player. He was born in Gothenburg. Making his debut in the national team in 1993, he played a total of 268 games and scored 1138 goals. During his adult career he played for Redbergslids IK (in Gothenburg), and German sides TV Niederwürzbach and Champions League- and Bundesliga-winning team THW Kiel. He was the captain of the national team during the period 1996–2006 and for THW Kiel 2001–2009. He is a five-time Swedish league champion with Redbergslid, and a seven-time Bundesliga champion with THW. He won the German cup four times, and he helped lead Kiel to the European Champions League title in 2007 (being a finalist in 2000, 2008 and 2009).

Lövgren was World Champion in 1999 with the national team and is one of the few players to have participated in all the gold medal-winning Swedish sides in the European Championships (1994, 1998, 2000, 2002). As an individual player, he was named Most Valuable Player in both the 1999 and 2001 World Championships, was top scorer in the Olympic Games in 2000 and provided the most assists during the 2005 World Men's Handball Championship in what proved to be his final major tournament. He is a former member of the IHF Athletes Commission, and is one of the most respected players in team handball (with, among others, Nikola Karabatić citing him as a role model both as a person, player and captain).

Lövgren is a two-time Olympic silver medalist. In the 1996 Atlanta games, the Swedish team won the silver medal with Lövgren playing all seven matches and scoring a total of 17 goals. Four years later in Sydney Sweden again won silver. Lövgren played all eight matches and scored 51 goals.

In January 2010, Lövgren returned to the US to play in the Big Apple Team Handball Tournament where he competed with a group of European all-stars against the reigning US club champions, New York City THC.  Lövgren and the all-stars won 39-27.

Lövgren lives in Kungälv outside Gothenburg with his wife and their two children.

World championships
 1995 – bronze
 1997 – silver
 1999 – gold
 2001 – silver

European Championships
 1994 – gold
 1998 – gold
 2000 – gold
 2002 – gold

Olympic Games
 1996 – silver
 2000 – silver

See also
List of handballers with 1000 or more international goals

References

External links

 

1970 births
Living people
Swedish male handball players
Olympic handball players of Sweden
Handball players at the 1996 Summer Olympics
Handball players at the 2000 Summer Olympics
Olympic silver medalists for Sweden
Swedish expatriate sportspeople in Germany
Olympic medalists in handball
Redbergslids IK players
TV Niederwürzbach players
THW Kiel players
Medalists at the 2000 Summer Olympics
Medalists at the 1996 Summer Olympics